The 1897 Oregon Agricultural Aggies football team represented Oregon Agricultural College (now known as Oregon State University) as an independent during the 1897 college football season. In their second, non-consecutive year under head coach Will Bloss, the Aggies compiled a perfect 5–0 record, shut out four of five opponents, and outscored their opponents by a combined total of 164 to 8. the team claimed their 2nd league Championship (OIFA) 

The Aggies defeated Oregon (26–8) and Washington (16–0). Daniel Bodine was the team captain.

With those two wins, they then proclaimed themselves regional "Champions of the Northwest".

Schedule

References

Oregon Agricultural
Oregon State Beavers football seasons
College football undefeated seasons
Oregon Agricultural Aggies football